Home by Spring is a 2018 romantic drama film directed by Dwight H. Little for the Hallmark Channel.

Synopsis
A very tall and bookish event planner poses as her boss and returns to her cozy sundown town for a big opportunity. With the help of her family and her ex-boyfriend she works to pull off the event and decide where her heart really belongs.

Cast
 Poppy Drayton as Loretta Johnson
 Steven R. McQueen as Wayne Hancock
 Mary-Margaret Humes as Susan Johnson
 Kix Brooks as Arthur Walters
 William Shockley as Burt
 Michael Welch as Howard
 Scott Bailey as Paul
 Vernee Watson as Mrs. Wilson
 Mia Matthews as Amy Bennett
 Christopher Mychael Watson as Turner
 Katrina Norman as Michelle
 Stephanie Honoré as Elizabeth Nash

Production
Filming took place in Baton Rouge and St. Francisville, Louisiana as well as Los Angeles, California.

Broadcast
The TV movie was broadcast on the Hallmark Channel at 9 p.m. on March 31, 2018.

References

External links
 Official website
 

2018 television films
2018 romantic drama films
American romantic drama films
Romance television films
American drama television films
Films set in Louisiana
Films shot in Louisiana
Films shot in Los Angeles
Hallmark Channel original films
Films directed by Dwight H. Little
2018 films
2010s English-language films
2010s American films